Events from the year 2016 in Belarus

Incumbents
 President: Alexander Lukashenko
 Prime Minister: Andrei Kobyakov

Events
15 January –  the geostationary telecommunications satellite Belintersat-1 was launched for the Belarusian government's company Belintersat.
5-21 August – Belarus at the 2016 Summer Olympics: 124 competitors in 18 sports. 
11 September – 2016 Belarusian parliamentary election

Deaths

29 March – Nil Hilevich, poet (b. 1931).

9 June – Stepan Bondarev, Belarusian Soviet Army lieutenant general (b. 1923)
26 June – Sergei Cortez, composer (b. 1935).
26 June – Rostislav Yankovsky, actor (b. 1930)
16 July – Oleg Syrokvashko, footballer (b. 1961)
20 July – Pavel Sheremet, Belarusian-born Russian journalist (b. 1971)
October – Svetlana Penkina, actress (b. 1951)
17 December – Leanid Marakou, journalist and historian (b. 1958)

References

 
Years of the 21st century in Belarus
Belarus
Belarus
2010s in Belarus